The malleus, or hammer, is a hammer-shaped small bone or ossicle of the middle ear. It connects with the incus, and is attached to the inner surface of the eardrum. The word is Latin for 'hammer' or 'mallet'. It transmits the sound vibrations from the eardrum to the incus (anvil).

Structure

The malleus is a bone situated in the middle ear. It is the first of the three ossicles, and attached to the tympanic membrane. The head of the malleus is the large protruding section, which attaches to the incus. The head connects to the neck of malleus. The bone continues as the handle (or manubrium) of malleus, which connects to the tympanic membrane. Between the neck and handle of the malleus, lateral and anterior processes emerge from the bone. The bone is oriented so that the head is superior and the handle is inferior.

Development
Embryologically, the malleus is derived from the first pharyngeal arch along with the incus. It grows from Meckel's cartilage.

Function

The malleus is one of three ossicles in the middle ear which transmit sound from the tympanic membrane (ear drum) to the inner ear. The malleus receives vibrations from the tympanic membrane and transmits this to the incus.

Clinical significance 
The malleus may be palpated by surgeons during ear surgery. It may become fixed in place due to surgical complications, causing hearing loss. This may be corrected with further surgery.

History
Several sources  attribute the discovery of the malleus to the anatomist and philosopher Alessandro Achillini. The first brief written description of the malleus was by Berengario da Carpi in his Commentaria super anatomia Mundini (1521). Niccolo Massa's Liber introductorius anatomiae described the malleus in slightly more detail and likened both it and the incus to little hammers terming them malleoli.

Other animals 
The malleus is unique to mammals, and evolved from a lower jaw bone in basal amniotes called the articular, which still forms part of the jaw joint in reptiles and birds.

Additional images

See also

 Bone terminology
 Evolution of mammalian auditory ossicles
 Ligaments of malleus
 Terms for anatomical location

References

Auditory system
Bones of the head and neck
Ear
Ossicles